Soap Creek may refer to the following places:
Soap Creek (Des Moines River tributary)
Soap Creek (Missouri)
Texas:
Soap Creek (Witchita River tributary)
Soap Creek (Mountain Creek tributary)

See also 
 Soap (disambiguation)